Antonio Pucci (1923, Petralia Sottana – 15 July 2009) was an Italian racing driver of the 1950s and 1960s. He was an official test driver for Porsche and won the Targa Florio in April 1964 with the English driver Colin Davis.

References

External links
  Interview with Antonio Pucci
  Article at Omniauto

1923 births
2009 deaths
People from Petralia Sottana
Italian racing drivers
World Sportscar Championship drivers
Sportspeople from the Province of Palermo